
Gmina Białowieża is a rural gmina (administrative district) in Hajnówka County, Podlaskie Voivodeship, in north-eastern Poland, on the border with Belarus.

Villages
Gmina Białowieża contains the villages and settlements of Białowieża, Czerlonka, Grudki, Podcerkwy, Podolany, Pogorzelce, Przewłoka, Teremiski and Zwierzyniec.

Neighbouring gminas
Gmina Białowieża is bordered by the gminas of Hajnówka, Narew and Narewka. It also borders Belarus.

References
Polish official population figures 2006

Bialowieza
Hajnówka County